Savji (also spelt as Saoji, Souji, Sauji) is a Hindu community found in the Indian state of Maharashtra.

Cuisine
Savji food is known for its very hot and spicy flavour in many cities (where they are in large number) served in small family-style restaurants called Savji khanavali or "Savji hotel" or bhojanalaya, found in places like Nagpur in Maharashtra.

Language
Savji people speak a language called "Savji bhasha" or "Khatri bhasha" in some regions that belongs to the Indo-Aryan language family and appears to be an amalgamation of Indic languages such as Sanskrit, Hindi, Marathi, Sindhi, Gujarati, Marwari.

References

External links

Ethnic groups in India
Social groups of Maharashtra